

Arthropods

Newly named insects

Archosauromorphs

Newly named dinosaurs

Newly named birds

References